Rudbar (also Romanized as Rūdbar) is a village in Kuhgir Rural District, Tarom Sofla District, Qazvin County, Qazvin Province, Iran. At the 2006 census, its population was 38, in 9 families.

References 

Populated places in Qazvin County